Gretchen is a female given name.

Gretchen may also refer to:

 Gretchen (band), a female-fronted alternative rock band
 Gretchen (film), a 2006 film
 Gretchen (play), an 1879 play by W. S. Gilbert based on the Faust legend
 Hurricane Gretchen, three tropical cyclones in the Eastern Pacific Ocean
 , the name of more than one United States Navy ship
 Gretchen Goes to Nebraska, a 1990 album by King's X, often called Gretchen